Andong "Misha" Song (born January 31, 1997) is a Chinese collegiate ice hockey player. Song is notable for being the first Mainland Chinese-born hockey player to be drafted in the National Hockey League (NHL). Song was drafted in the sixth round, 172nd overall in the 2015 NHL Entry Draft by the New York Islanders.

Early and personal life
Song was born in Beijing, the son of Yu Song and Bei Gao, before moving to Oakville, Ontario at age 10, and he became a fan of the Ottawa Senators.

Playing career
As a child, Song played in the Beijing International Ice Hockey League (BIIHL) minor league. When selected by the Islanders in the 2015 NHL Entry Draft, Song played for the Lawrenceville School in New Jersey followed by a post graduate year at Phillips Academy, Andover in Massachusetts. 

He played two seasons in the United States Hockey League (USHL) with the Madison Capitols after he was selected 160th overall in the 2016 USHL Entry Draft by the club before committing to play collegiate hockey at Cornell University of the ECAC from the 2018–19 season.

International play
Song has represented China internationally for the Chinese national team at the 2014 IIHF World U18 Championships, Division II-B and as a captain for the 2015 competition.

Career statistics

Regular season and playoffs

International

See also
Larry Kwong, Canadian-born Cantonese ethnicity NHL player for one season with the late-1940s New York Rangers.

References

https://www.nytimes.com/2016/01/31/sports/hockey/honing-skills-in-us-a-group-of-teenagers-is-fueling-chinas-hockey-shift.html

External links

1997 births
Chinese ice hockey defencemen
Cornell Big Red men's ice hockey players
Living people
Madison Capitols players
New York Islanders draft picks
Sportspeople from Beijing
Sportspeople from Oakville, Ontario